Blues at Carnegie Hall is a live album by American jazz group the Modern Jazz Quartet featuring performances recorded at Carnegie Hall in 1966 at a benefit concert presented by The Manhattan School of Music and released on the Atlantic label.

Reception
The Allmusic review stated "This predictable but consistently swinging set is particularly recommended to fans of vibraphonist Milt Jackson".

Track listing
All compositions by John Lewis except as indicated
 "Pyramid (Blues For Junior)" (Ray Brown) - 7:48   
 "The Cylinder" (Milt Jackson) - 4:56   
 "Really True Blues" (Jackson) - 4:28   
 "Ralph's New Blues" (Jackson) - 5:39   
 "Monterey Mist" (Jackson) - 4:09   
 "Home" - 3:56   
 "Blues Milanese" - 6:13   
 "Bags' Groove" (Jackson) -  4:13

Personnel
Milt Jackson - vibraphone
John Lewis - piano
Percy Heath - bass
Connie Kay - drums

References

Atlantic Records live albums
Modern Jazz Quartet live albums
1964 live albums
Albums produced by Nesuhi Ertegun
Albums recorded at Carnegie Hall